Rodrigo Celeste (born 30 June 1990) is a Brazilian footballer who plays for Ituano as a midfielder.

Personal life
Rodrigo's brother Bruno Celeste is also a footballer.

Career statistics

References

External links

1990 births
Living people
People from São José dos Campos
Brazilian footballers
Association football midfielders
Campeonato Brasileiro Série C players
Campeonato Brasileiro Série D players
Ituano FC players
Footballers from São Paulo (state)